Derfflinger may refer to:

In warships:
 SMS Derfflinger, a battlecruiser of the Imperial German Navy, launched in 1913
Derfflinger-class battlecruiser

People with the surname
 Georg von Derfflinger (1606 – 1695), Austrian nobleman, field marshal in the army of Brandenburg

See also 
 :Category:Derfflinger-class battlecruisers
 3rd Grenadier zu Pferde (cavalry) regiment (Neumärkisches) of the 4. Kav. Brigade, a unit of the Prussian army in the 3rd Division, with the honorary name of "Freiherr von Derfflinger" 

German-language surnames